Curtis Giles Charles Bolton III (December 18, 1995) is an American football middle linebacker for the Las Vegas Raiders of the National Football League (NFL). He played college football at Oklahoma.

Early years
Bolton finished his senior season with 109 tackles including 29 for a loss and 13 sacks while being named defensive MVP of the Southwestern league. Bolton committed to Oklahoma over offers for Arizona, Fresno State and others.

College career
Bolton started one season at Oklahoma, his senior season. Bolton recorded 138 tackles, 12 tackles for loss, 4.5 sacks and 2 pass deflected.

Professional career

Green Bay Packers
After going undrafted Bolton signed with the Green Bay Packers. He started the preseason totaling 8 tackles, two pass deflections and an interception in the first two preseason games. Bolton tore his anterior cruciate ligament in a preseason game and was placed on the season-ending injured reserve. He was placed on the active/physically unable to perform list (PUP) at the start of training camp on July 31, 2020. He was moved to the reserve/PUP list at the start of the regular season on September 5, 2020. On October 6, Bolton was waived by the Packers.

Houston Texans
On November 10, 2020, Bolton was signed to the Houston Texans practice squad. He signed a reserve/future contract on January 4, 2021. He was waived on March 16, 2021.

Indianapolis Colts
On August 10, 2021, Bolton signed with the Indianapolis Colts. He was waived on August 31, 2021 and re-signed to the practice squad the next day, but released two days later.

San Francisco 49ers
On September 14, 2021, Bolton was signed to the San Francisco 49ers practice squad. He was released on October 5.

Detroit Lions
On December 1, 2021, Bolton was signed to the Detroit Lions practice squad. Bolton made his NFL debut in a game against the Denver Broncos on December 12, 2021. He was promoted to the active roster on December 28.

On April 27, 2022, Bolton was waived by the Lions.

Las Vegas Raiders
On August 1, 2022, Bolton signed with the Las Vegas Raiders. He was waived on August 30, 2022 and signed to the practice squad the next day. On October 10, 2022 Bolton was elevated to the active roster for the week 5 game against the Kansas City Chiefs. He was promoted to the active roster on November 10.

References

External links
247Sports bio
Oklahoma Sooners Football bio
Green Bay Packers bio

1995 births
Living people
American football linebackers
Green Bay Packers players
Houston Texans players
Indianapolis Colts players
Oklahoma Sooners football players
Players of American football from Honolulu
San Francisco 49ers players
Detroit Lions players